Chlorocypha glauca is a species of jewel damselfly in the family Chlorocyphidae.

The IUCN conservation status of Chlorocypha glauca is "LC", least concern, with no immediate threat to the species' survival. The IUCN status was reviewed in 2010.

References

Further reading

 

Chlorocyphidae
Articles created by Qbugbot
Insects described in 1879